James Patrick O'Rourke, identified as both Charlie and Jim (born June 22, 1937) is a retired American professional baseball player. An outfielder by trade, O'Rourke played two games of Major League Baseball as a pinch hitter for the  St. Louis Cardinals. He was born in Walla Walla, Washington, where he graduated from St. Patrick High School, and matriculated at Santa Clara University.

O'Rourke signed with the Cardinals in June 1959 for a $60,000 bonus and began his professional career on June 16, 1959, in a Major League uniform.  He appeared in both ends of a twi-night doubleheader against the Philadelphia Phillies at Busch Stadium. In the opener, he batted for Cardinal shortstop Alex Grammas in the seventh inning; in the nightcap, also in the seventh, he hit for Redbird starting pitcher Ernie Broglio. In each case, O'Rourke bounced out to Phillie shortstop Joe Koppe.  O'Rourke did not play in another Major League game.  After his debut, he was sent to the minor leagues for more experience, but struggled as a hitter and retired after the 1962 season.

References

External links
Career record and playing statistics from Baseball Reference

1937 births
Living people
Baseball outfielders
Baseball players from Washington (state)
Lancaster Red Roses players
Memphis Chickasaws players
Portsmouth-Norfolk Tides players
Rochester Red Wings players
St. Louis Cardinals players
Santa Clara University alumni
Santa Clara Broncos baseball players
Sportspeople from Walla Walla, Washington
Tulsa Oilers (baseball) players